Denbigh railway station  served the town of Denbigh in Wales. It closed in 1962. The only remains of the station are sections of platform edge.

The Vale of Clwyd Railway had used a temporary stop at Denbigh from 1858 until their station buildings, which also housed their headquarters, were constructed. The station was designed, along with several other stations on the line, by the local firm of Lloyd Williams and Underwood. It opened in December 1860 and was for some time the terminus of the railway, until the line extension to Ruthin opened in 1862.

The Tudor Gothic-style station building, which incorporated accommodation on the first-floor for the station master, primarily used limestone, with detailing such as around the doors, windows and chimneys being of freestone. The booking and left luggage offices were placed centrally, and there were three waiting rooms - a general room, one for ladies travelling first-class and another for those ladies travelling second-class. There was an initially single platform, partly sheltered by a roof supported by cast iron columns. That platform was extended in 1885 and altered also to allow trains to stop regardless of their direction of travel.

Railtours
A rail enthusiasts tour of the region called at the site of Denbigh station on 24 September 1966.

References

Further reading

Disused railway stations in Denbighshire
Former London and North Western Railway stations
Railway stations in Great Britain opened in 1860
Railway stations in Great Britain closed in 1962
Denbigh